Johannes Moe (born 24 April 1926) is a Norwegian engineer and research administrator.

He was born in Modalen, and graduated from the Norwegian Institute of Technology in 1952. He was appointed professor at the Norwegian Institute of Technology from 1962 to 1976, and from 1972 to 1976 he served as rector of the institute. From 1977 to 1989 he was appointed director of SINTEF. He served as president of the Norwegian Academy of Technological Sciences from 1993 to 1999. He was decorated Commander of the Order of St. Olav in 1976.

Moe was elected a member of the National Academy of Engineering in 1977 for contributions to structural analyses and optimization with applications to wood and concrete construction and to ship and shell structures.

References

1926 births
Living people
People from Modalen
Norwegian engineers
Norwegian Institute of Technology alumni
Academic staff of the Norwegian Institute of Technology
Rectors of the Norwegian University of Science and Technology
Members of the Norwegian Academy of Technological Sciences